The 1935 San Francisco Dons football team was an American football team that represented the University of San Francisco as an independent during the 1935 college football season. In their fourth season under head coach Spud Lewis, the Dons compiled a 5–3 record and outscored their opponents by a combined total of 104 to 55.

Schedule

References

San Francisco
San Francisco Dons football seasons
San Francisco Dons football